LSG-1 or LSG1 may refer to:
Farrar LSG-1 Bird Flight Machine, research glider
LSG1, a human enzyme